Year 1196 (MCXCVI) was a leap year starting on Monday (link will display the full calendar) of the Julian calendar.

Events 
 By place 

 Byzantine Empire 
 December – Emperor Alexios III (Angelos) is threatened by Emperor Henry VI, Holy Roman Emperor, who demands 5,000 pounds of gold or the Byzantines will face an invasion, this due to a convoluted system of dynastic claims of Henry gaining control of Alexios' daughter Irene Doukaina. The amount is negotiated down to 1,600 pounds of gold – with Alexios plundering the imperial tombs within the Church of the Holy Apostles – as well as levying a heavy and unpopular tax, known as the Alamanikon (or German Tax).

 Europe 
 Spring – Henry VI persuades a diet at Würzburg. He manages to convince the majority of the German nobles and clergy to recognize his 2-year-old son, Frederick II, as king of the Romans and heir to the imperial throne. However, Archbishop Adolf of Cologne thwarts the will of the diet and arouses the resistance of several Saxon and Thuringian nobles against Henry, who realizes that he is unable to establish a hereditary monarchy (see Erbreichsplan) in the Holy Roman Empire without resistance.
 April 23 – Béla III dies after a 23-year reign in which he has supported the former Byzantine emperor Isaac II (Angelos) against the invading Bulgarians. Having made the Hungarian court one of the most brilliant in Europe and made his hereditary monarchy. Béla is succeeded by his 22-year-old son Emeric as ruler of Hungary, Croatia and Dalmatia (until 1204).
 April 25 – King Alfonso II (the Chaste) dies after a 32-year reign at Perpignan. He leaves a will that divides his realm (Aragon loses Provence) and is succeeded by his 21-year-old son Peter II (the Catholic).
 Battle of Serres: Bulgarian forces under Tsar Ivan Asen I defeat the Byzantine army near Serres. During the winter Ivan continues his campaign in Central Macedonia and captures many Byzantine fortresses.
 Ivan Asen I is stabbed to death by Ivanko, a Bulgarian boyar (aristocrat), who is accused of having an affair with Ivan's wife's sister. He is succeeded by his brother Kaloyan as co-ruler of the Bulgarian Empire.

 England 
 Spring – William FitzOsbert, a rebel leader, leads an uprising of the poor against the rich in London. He gathers over 52,000 supporters, stocks of weapons are cached throughout the city by breaking into the houses of the rich. Finally, the riots are suppressed and William is hanged, drawn and quartered by orders of Hubert Walter, archbishop of Canterbury. 
 England is struck by pestilence and a resulting famine.

 Asia 
 Choe Chung-heon, a Korean general, massacres his rivals and restores unity. After a coup d'état, he takes full power and becomes prime-minister of the Korean state Goryeo (until 1219).

Births 
 January 3 – Tsuchimikado, emperor of Japan (d. 1231)

 February 21 – Emre, Gizilgen of Konuşmalı Pubcast (d. —)

 March 27 – Sviatoslav III, Kievan Grand Prince (d. 1252)
 Abul Hasan ash-Shadhili, Almohad scholar (d. 1258)
 Alberico II, Italian troubadour and statesman (d. 1260)
 Aurembiaix, Spanish countess (House of Urgell) (d. 1231)
 Dōjonyūdō, Japanese nobleman and waka poet (d. 1249)
 Henry II (the Pious), High Duke of Poland (d. 1241)
 Henry VI (the Younger), German nobleman (d. 1214)
 Pedro Alfonso de León, Spanish nobleman (d. 1226)
 William II of Dampierre, French nobleman (d. 1231)

Deaths 
 January 6 – Burchard du Puiset, Norman archdeacon
 April 23 – Béla III, king of Hungary and Croatia (b. 1148)
 April 25 – Alfonso II (the Chaste), king of Aragon (b. 1157)
 April 30 – Baldwin II van Holland, bishop of Utrecht 
 July 12 – Maurice II de Craon, Norman nobleman
 August 14 – Henry IV (the Blind), count of Luxembourg
 August 15 – Conrad II, German nobleman (b. 1172)
 September 11 – Maurice de Sully, bishop of Paris
 November 30 – Richard of Acerra, Norman nobleman
 Agnetha Ní Máelshechlainn, abbess of Clonard
 Canute I (Eriksson), king of Sweden (approximate date)
 Dulcea of Worms, German Jewish businesswoman
 Ephraim of Bonn, German rabbi and writer (b. 1132)
 Eschiva of Ibelin, queen consort of Cyprus (b. 1160)
 Godfrey of Viterbo, Italian chronicler (approximate date)
 Hugh III of Rodez, French nobleman (House of Millau)
 Ibn Mada', Andalusian scholar and polymath (b. 1116)
 Isaac Komnenos Vatatzes, Byzantine aristocrat
 Ivan Asen I, ruler (tsar) of the Bulgarian Empire
 Jamal al-Din al-Ghaznawi, Arab jurist and theologian
 Roger fitzReinfrid, English sheriff and royal justice
 Taira no Kagekiyo, Japanese nobleman and samurai
 Vira Bahu I, ruler of the Kingdom of Polonnaruwa
 Vsevolod I Svyatoslavich (the Fierce), Kievan prince
 Wartislaw Swantibor (the Younger), Polish nobleman
 William FitzOsbert, English politician and rebel leader
 William of Salisbury, English nobleman and high sheriff
 Yaish ibn Yahya, Portuguese politician and advisor

References